This is a list of areas and neighborhoods in Bangalore by region. In recent decades, the city has witnessed rapid growth in population and urbanized area. While Central Bangalore is the commercial heart of the city, Eastern and South-Eastern Bangalore areas are major hubs for IT and financial companies. Southern and Western parts of the city are mainly residential areas. The neighborhoods in the Northern and North-Eastern regions are both industrial and residential.

Central

Eastern

North-Eastern

Northern

South-Eastern

Southern

Southern suburbs

Western

Peripheral towns
Although not technically part of Bangalore metropolitan area, these towns are considered to be part of Bangalore:

Attibele, at the junction of NH44 and SH35 on the Karnataka–Tamil Nadu border
Anekal, along SH35

Chandapura, along NH44
Thavarekere
Chikkabanavara, along SH39
Hesaraghatta, along SH39
Jigani, along SH87
Nelamangala, along NH48 and NH75
Sarjapura, along NH648 and SH35 on the Karnataka–Tamil Nadu border

References 

neighbourhoods
Bangalore